Mohamed Fakhir (born 19 October 1953) is a Moroccan football manager and former player.

He was manager of the Morocco national team, and was coach of Raja Casablanca until he was sacked in November 2013.

References

External links
Profile 

1953 births
Living people
Moroccan footballers
Footballers from Casablanca
Moroccan football managers
Raja CA players
Moghreb Tétouan managers
Hassania Agadir managers
Étoile Sportive du Sahel managers
Raja CA managers
2006 Africa Cup of Nations managers
AS FAR (football) managers
Botola managers
Association footballers not categorized by position